HMS Worcester was a 64-gun third-rate ship of the line of the Royal Navy, launched on 17 October 1769 at Portsmouth, and was the fourth ship to bear the name.

In 1783, Worcester took part in the Battle of Cuddalore.

She was broken up in Deptford in 1816, after having been hulked in 1788. She is best known as the ship on which Lord Nelson won an acting commission in 1776 as the fourth lieutenant.

In fiction
A 74-gun ship by the name of HMS Worcester featured in The Ionian Mission by Patrick O'Brian.

Notes

References

 Lavery, Brian (2003) The Ship of the Line - Volume 1: The development of the battlefleet 1650-1850. Conway Maritime Press. .

Ships of the line of the Royal Navy
Worcester-class ships of the line
1769 ships